The 2015 South Northamptonshire District Council election took place on 7 May 2015 to elect members of South Northamptonshire District Council in England. This was on the same day as other local elections.

Election results 

|}

Results

References

2015 English local elections
May 2015 events in the United Kingdom
2015
2010s in Northamptonshire